The fifty-lei banknote is one of the circulating denomination of the Romanian leu. It is the same size as the 50 Euro banknote.

The main color of the banknote is yellow. It pictures, on the obverse, pilot and engineer Aurel Vlaicu, and on the reverse the A Vlaicu Nr. II airplane design, the head of an eagle, and the sketch of the Gnome motor of his airplane.

History 
In earlier times, the denomination was also in the coin form, as follows:

First leu (1867-1947)
 banknote issue: 1877 (the hypothecary issue)
 coin issues: 1906 (gold, celebration issue), 1937 (re-issue: 1938)

Second leu (1947-1952)
 no issues

Third leu - ROL (1952-2005)
 banknote issue: 1966
 coin issue: 1991 (re-issues: 1992, 1993, 1994, 1995, 1996)

Fourth leu - RON (since 2005)
 banknote issue: 2005 (redesigned issue of the former 500.000 lei banknote, whereas 500.000 third lei = 50 fourth lei)

References 

National Bank of Romania website

Fifty lei
Fifty-base-unit banknotes